Angus David MacRobert (born 15 October 1968) is a South African former cricketer.

MacRobert was born at Pretoria in October 1968. He studied at the University of Cape Town, before undertaking his post-graduate studies in England at Keble College, Oxford. While studying at Oxford, he made his debut in first-class cricket for Oxford University against Durham at Oxford in 1995. He made a total of nine first-class appearances for Oxford in 1995, taking 18 wickets with his right-arm medium-fast bowling at an average of 46.83, with best figures of 4 for 41. In addition to playing first-class cricket while at Oxford, he also made three List A one-day appearances for the Combined Universities cricket team in the 1995 Benson & Hedges Cup, taking 5 wickets at an average of 34.60, with best figues of 3 for 51.

References

External links

1968 births
Living people
Cricketers from Pretoria
University of Cape Town alumni
Alumni of Keble College, Oxford
South African cricketers
Oxford University cricketers
British Universities cricketers